Long Hard Climb is the fourth studio album by Australian-American pop singer Helen Reddy, released on July 23, 1973, by Capitol Records and, aside from its primary focus on Top 40-friendly material, had her trying out New Orleans jazz ("Lovin' You") and the English-language version of a recent Charles Aznavour standard ("The Old Fashioned Way"). It debuted on Billboard'''s Top LP's & Tapes chart in the issue dated August 11, 1973, and reached number eight during its 43 weeks there, and in Canada's RPM magazine it peaked at number 14. On September 19 of that year, the Recording Industry Association of America awarded the album with Gold certification for sales of 500,000 copies in the United States. On July 22, 2003, it was released for the first time on compact disc as one of two albums on one CD, the other album being her 1972 release I Am Woman.



Singles
"Delta Dawn" was released as the first single from the album on June 11, 1973, debuted on Billboard's  Hot 100 later that month, in the issue of the magazine dated June 23, and enjoyed 20 weeks there, one of which was at number one. That same issue also marked its first appearance on the magazine's Easy Listening chart, where it lasted for 16 weeks, with two of those being in the top spot. On August 30 of that year the song earned Gold certification from the RIAA for sales of the one million copies that was the requirement for singles at that time. It also had three weeks at number one on RPM's singles chart in Canada. The sing was certified Gold in Australia in March 1974.

"Leave Me Alone (Ruby Red Dress)" was released as a single on October 29 of that year and had 16 weeks on the pop chart that began in the November 3 issue and eventually included two weeks at number three. It also spent 16 weeks on the Easy Listening chart that started in the November 10 issue and included four weeks at number one. On January 8, 1974, it received Gold certification, and it peaked at number five in Canada in the issue of RPM dated January 12.

Track listing
Side 1
 "Leave Me Alone (Ruby Red Dress)" (Linda Laurie) – 3:26
 "Lovin' You" (John Sebastian) – 2:49
 "A Bit O.K." (Peter Allen, Carole Bayer Sager) – 2:07
 "Don't Mess with a Woman" (Michael Curtis, Richard Curtis, Patty Moan) – 3:04
 "Delta Dawn" (Larry Collins, Alex Harvey) – 3:08
Side 2
 "The West Wind Circus" (Adam Miller) – 4:25
 "If We Could Still Be Friends" (Paul Williams) – 2:17
 "Long Hard Climb" (Ron Davies) – 2:59
 "Until It's Time for You to Go" (Buffy Sainte-Marie) – 2:17
 "The Old Fashioned Way" (Georges Garvarentz, Joel Hirschhorn, Al Kasha) – 2:56

Alternate version of "Don't Mess with a Woman"

In 2009 EMI Music Special Markets released Rarities from the Capitol Vaults'', a 12-track CD of mostly what were previously unreleased Reddy recordings, which included an alternate version of "Don't Mess with a Woman".

Personnel
Helen Reddy – vocals
Tom Catalano – producer (except as noted)
Al Capps – arranger and conductor ("Leave Me Alone (Ruby Red Dress)", "Delta Dawn", "Long Hard Climb")
Lee Holdridge – arranger and conductor ("The West Wind Circus", "If We Could Still Be Friends", "The Old Fashioned Way")
Armin Steiner – engineer 
Jay Senter – producer ("Don't Mess with a Woman")
Jim Horn – horn arrangements ("Don't Mess with a Woman")
Doug Sax – cutting engineer 
Jeff Wald – management
Norman Seeff – photography
John Hoernle – art direction

Charts

Certifications

Notes

References

 

1973 albums
Capitol Records albums
Helen Reddy albums
Albums arranged by Lee Holdridge
Albums produced by Tom Catalano